Igor Borisowicz Kupiejew (born 20 February 1974) - Russian and (since 1997) Uzbek professional wrestler fighting freestyle. Three times took a part World Wrestling Championships, fourth in 1996. Seventh at Asian Games in 1998. Gold medal at Asian Championships in 1999, 2000. First place in FILA Wrestling World Cup in 1996. Has earned bronze medal in Junior World's Championships in 1992.

Bibliography 
 Career on Fila.com 
 Career on Foeldeak.com

Russian wrestlers
Living people
1974 births